Mai Anbessa is an Eritrea football club based in Asmara.

References

Football clubs in Eritrea
Organisations based in Asmara